The Winstons were an American funk and soul music group based in Washington, D.C. They are known for their 1969 recording featuring a song entitled "Color Him Father" on the A-side, and "Amen, Brother" on the B-side. Halfway into "Amen, Brother", there is a drum solo (performed by G.C. Coleman) which would cause the release to become the most widely sampled record in the history of electronic music. Sampled audio clips of the drum solo became known as the Amen break, which has been used in thousands of tracks in many musical genres, including drum and bass, hip hop, jungle, big beat and industrial.

The "Color Him Father" record sold over one million copies, and received a gold record awarded by the Recording Industry Association of America on 24 July 1969. It also won a Grammy Award for the Best Rhythm and Blues Song (1969).

Members
 Joe Phillips (lead guitar, bandleader)
 Richard Lewis Spencer (tenor saxophone, lead vocals)
 Ray Maritano (alto saxophone, backing vocals)
 Quincy Mattison (guitar, backing vocals)
 Phil Tolotta (organ, co-lead vocals)
 Sonny Pekerol, J.Lee Zane (bass guitar, backing vocals)
 Gregory C. Coleman (drums, backing vocals)

The Winstons toured as backup for the Impressions.

Notable songs
 "Color Him Father" – (1969, Billboard Hot 100 # 7)
 "Amen, Brother" – (1969)
 "Love of the Common People" – (1969, Billboard Hot 100 # 54)

See also
 Amen break
 Breakbeat
 Jungle music
 Drum and bass

References

External links
 

American funk musical groups
American soul musical groups
Musical groups from Washington, D.C.
The Impressions members